Nancy Drew and the Hidden Staircase is a 1939 American mystery film directed by William Clemens and written by Kenneth Garnet. It is fourth and last in a series of films starring Bonita Granville as teenage amateur detective Nancy Drew, Frankie Thomas as her boyfriend, and John Litel as her father. It was loosely based on the novel of the same name by Mildred Wirt Benson. The film was released by Warner Bros. on September 9, 1939.

Plot
The elderly Turnbull sisters want to donate their mansion for a children's hospital. However, their father's will states that at least one of them has to stay in the house every night for twenty years before they can inherit the estate; there are two weeks left to go.

Then some strange things start occurring. A stranger forces his way past Nancy Drew (Bonita Granville) and brazenly searches the Drew house for related affidavits her lawyer father Carson (John Litel) has obtained. Then, the Turnbulls' chauffeur Phillips (Don Rowan) dies, though it is uncertain if it was a murder or a suicide. The frightened old ladies consider leaving their home. When Nancy recognizes the dead man as the trespasser, she begins investigating, dragging her boyfriend Ted Nickerson (Frankie Thomas) into one predicament after another, eventually getting him fired and jailed.

When police Captain Tweedy (Frank Orth) arrests the two sisters for Phillips' murder, their ownership is endangered. Just in time, Nancy and Ted discover a secret passageway in the basement linking it to the neighboring house, owned by Daniel Talbert (William Gould). Talbert would make a lot of money if a racetrack were to be built on the two properties, but the Turnbulls had turned down an offer to buy their place.

Cast
 Bonita Granville as Nancy Drew
 Frankie Thomas as Ted Nickerson
 John Litel as Carson Drew
 Frank Orth as Captain Tweedy
 Renie Riano as Effie Schneider
 Vera Lewis as Rosemary Turnbull
 Louise Carter as Floretta Turnbull
 William Gould as Daniel Talbert
 George Guhl as Smitty
 John Ridgely as Reporter 
 William Hopper as Reporter 
 Creighton Hale as Reporter 
 Frank Mayo as Tribune Photographer
 Frederic Tozere as District Attorney's Investigator 
 Don Rowan as Phillips the Chauffeur  
 Dick Elliott as McKeever 
 Jack Mower as Ice Company Dispatcher (uncredited)
 Cliff Saum as Burt the Iceman (uncredited)

Production
It was the only film to borrow its title from a book in the series, although the plot was altered substantially. One critic wrote that "the only similarity between the book and the film was the word staircase." Nancy's boyfriend Ned Nickerson became Ted Nickerson, as "Ned" was considered too old-fashioned, and housekeeper Hannah Gruen was replaced by Effie Schneider, a minor character who had appeared in only a few books as the Drews' part-time maid; in the films, Effie's traits are combined with Hannah's. Nancy's friends George and Bess were eliminated completely, "mystery elements were downplayed, plots simplified, and the romance spiced up." To promote the film, Warner Bros. created a Nancy Drew fan club that included a set of rules, such as: "Must have steady boy friend, in the sense of a 'pal'" and must "Take part in choosing own clothes." These rules were based on some research Warner Bros. had done on the habits and attitudes of "typical" teenage girls.

Bonita Granville starred four films — Nancy Drew... Detective (1938), Nancy Drew... Reporter (1939), Nancy Drew... Trouble Shooter (1939), and Nancy Drew and the Hidden Staircase (1939).

References

External links
 
 
 
 

1939 films
1930s mystery films
American mystery films
1930s teen films
American black-and-white films
Films directed by William Clemens
Films scored by Heinz Roemheld
Teen mystery films
Films based on Nancy Drew
Warner Bros. films
1930s English-language films
1930s American films